Naseem Hamed vs. Vuyani Bungu, billed as "Capital Punishment" was a professional boxing match contested on March 11, 2000 for the WBO and Lineal featherweight championships.

Background
In his previous fight, Naseem Hamed defeated César Soto to add the WBC featherweight championship to his own WBO version of the title. Hamed had originally hoped to keep both titles, however, at the time the WBO was not a major sanctioning body, as a result the WBC refused to allow Hamed to hold his title with the WBO's and was subsequently stripped of the honour in January 2000. Shortly after Hamed's victory over Soto, his team began negotiations with former WBO super-bantamweight champion Junior Jones to be Hamed's next opponent for a scheduled March 11 fight. Jones, however, refused the terms of the contract and the fight was ultimately cancelled in January 2000. Only a week after the cancellation of the Hamed–Jones fight, it was announced that Hamed and then-current IBF super bantamweight champion Vuyani Bungu would meet instead. The fight between Hamed and Bungu had been over a year in the making, as both fighters had been two of the most successful champions in their respective weight classes with Hamed having been WBO featherweight champion for over four years, while Bungu had held the IBF super bantamweight title for over five years. Hamed, who was coming off of three consecutive lackluster performances, having gone the full 12-round distance with Wayne McCullough and César Soto and going deep into the fight with Paul Ingle before finally knocking Ingle out in the 11th round, promised that he would be "back to my best". Hamed also predicted a knockout or stoppage though he could not say when during the fight it would happen.

Prior to the bout, Hamed arguably his most famous pre-fight entrance, coming down to the ring on a "magic carpet" that was suspended from the ceiling while rapper Sean "Puff Daddy" Combs' song "I'll Do This for You" played in the background. When the magic carpet reached the floor, Combs himself met Hamed and walked him the rest of the way to the ring. HBO executive Seth Abraham announced that Hamed would no longer enter his fights in America with an extravagant entrance to the level he did with this fight.

The Fight
The fight was a return to form for Hamed, who dominated Bungu throughout the duration of the fight. Bungu tried to be aggressive but, Hamed hit Bungu with a mixture of jabs and power punches and easily won the first three rounds. In the fourth round, Hamed landed a left hand that dropped Bungu to the mat. Bungu attempted to get back up but was unable to beat referee Joe Cortez's 10 count, giving Hamed the knockout victory at 1:38 of the fourth round.

Fight card

References

2000 in boxing
Boxing matches
Boxing in England